Karka is a summit in the Hindu Raj range in Northern Pakistan and has a peak elevation of .
Multiple Italian expeditions have been exploring the area from a geographic and ethnographic point of view.
A group of climbers from Vicenza successfully climbed Karka for the first time in August 2007 during the expedition "La Gata - Karka 2007". In the course of the same expedition 4 other first ascents were performed in the Chiantar Glacier basin, while the trekking group set the route of what local guides already name "Trekking of the Italians".

Notes and references 

Mountains of Gilgit-Baltistan
Six-thousanders of the Hindu Raj